I come in peace or We come in peace may refer to:
a phrase stereotypically used in science fiction narratives by extraterrestrial visitors upon first meeting the inhabitants of a planet
 To come with friendly intentions 
"We came in peace for all mankind" - inscription on Apollo 11 Lunar plaque
I Come in Peace, a 1990 science fiction action film, originally produced and released internationally as Dark Angel
"Come in Piece", a song  by the Canadian rock band Doubting Thomas on their album The Infidel
 We Come in Peace with a Message of Love - 1985 Curtis Mayfield album
 We Come in Peace - art installation by Huma Bhabha
We Come in Pieces - 2011 DVD by rock band Placebo